During 1958-59 season Milan competed in Serie A and Coppa Italia.

Summary 
The team won its 7th title with a superb season  included the arrival of Brazilian forward José Altafini from Palmeiras. Following the World Cup in Sweden, Altafini's talent and offensive potential had been noticed by Milan's agents during some friendly matches in Italy against Inter and Fiorentina in preparation for the upcoming tournament, in which Altafini scored. He was purchased by the Italian club prior to the World Cup in Sweden for 135 million Lire.

Squad 

 (vice-captain)

 (Captain)

Transfers

Competitions

Serie A

League table

Matches

Coppa Italia 
Italian Football Federation re-lived the knock-out tournament after fifteen years with two editions in season 1958–59. The first edition was played before the kick-off of Serie A tournament due to 1960 European Nations' Cup qualifying which starting on 28 September 1958.
The second edition was played during the Serie A championship.

1958 Coppa Italia

Quarterfinals

Semifinals 5º/8º place

Final 5º/6º place

1958-59 Coppa Italia

Eightfinals

Friendship Cup

Statistics

Players statistics

Appearances
38.Alfio Fontana 
38.Cesare Maldini
37.José Altafini 
36.Francesco Zagatti
35.Giancarlo Danova
34.Carlo Galli
32.Nils Liedholm
30.Ernesto Grillo  
29.Vincenzo Occhetta
29.Juan Alberto Schiaffino
26.Lorenzo Buffon 
20.Gastone Bean 
12.Giancarlo Bacci 
12.Narciso Soldan
5.Luigi Radice
5.Sandro Salvadore
4.Eros Beraldo 
3.Bruno Ducati 
3.Paolo Ferrario 
3.Giancarlo Migliavacca 
2.Mario Trebbi 
1.Vittorino Mantovani 
1.Cesare Reina

Goalscorers

32.José Altafini
21.Giancarlo Danova
12.Carlo Galli 
10.Ernesto Grillo
5.Giancarlo Bacci
4.Gastone Bean
4.Vincenzo Occhetta
2.Nils Liedholm
2.Juan Alberto Schiaffino
1.Paolo Ferrario 
1.Alfio Fontana

References

External links 
 http://www.calcio.com/tutte_le_partite/ita-serie-a-1958-1959/

See also
 l'Unità, 1958 and 1959.
 La Stampa, 1958 and 1959.

A.C. Milan seasons
Milan
Italian football championship-winning seasons